Anne Lise Ådnøy (born 30 August 1957) is a Norwegian prelate who is the current Bishop of Stavanger.

Biography
Ådnøy was born on 30 August 1957 in Haga, Hordaland, Norway. She was ordained as a priest on 30 August 1984 for the Diocese of Agder og Telemark. She served as vicar in Kirkelandet and Frei between 1984 and 1985. Later she served as parish priest of Edøy Church, and in 1993 became a youth priest at the Church in Hundvåg, Stavanger. Between 2003 and 2011 she served as parish priest of St. Petri Church in Stavanger. She became provost of Stavanger Cathedral in 2011 and remained there until her consecration as bishop on 17 March 2019.

References

1957 births
Living people
Bishops of Stavanger
21st-century Lutheran bishops
Women Lutheran bishops
People from Hordaland